Macro-Chibchan is a proposed grouping of the languages of the Lencan, Misumalpan, and Chibchan families into a single large phylum (macrofamily).

History
The Lencan and Misumalpan languages were once included in the Chibchan family proper, but were excluded pending further evidence as that family became well established. Kaufman (1990) finds the Chibchan–Misumalpan connection convincing, if as yet unsubstantiated, though Campbell (1997) finds it doubtful. The Xincan family was once included in Macro-Chibchan, but this is now doubtful.

Constenla (2005) calls this proposed phylum Lenmichí (Lencan–Misumalpan–Chibchan) and provides 85 cognate sets which exhibit regular sound correspondences among the three families.  He suggests that Chocoan may be related as well.

Greenberg proposed a broader conception of Macro-Chibchan, one dismissed by linguists working on the families in question. It included Yanomam, Purépecha, and Cuitlatec in addition to Chibchan–Misumalpan–Xinca–Lenca. Greenberg (1987) included Paezan languages in a Chibchan-Paezan stock with Barbacoan, Chibchan, Chocoan, Jirajaran, and the isolates Betoi, Kamsá (Sibundoy), Yaruro, Esmeraldeño, Mochica, Cunza, Itonama, and Yurumanguí.

An automated computational analysis (ASJP 4) by Müller et al. (2013) also found lexical similarities between Chibchan and Misumalpan. However, since the analysis was automatically generated, the grouping could be either due to mutual lexical borrowing or genetic inheritance.

Reconstruction 

Constenla (2005) reconstructed five vowels and eleven consonants for Proto-Lenmichian, with the following reflexes:

Vowels 

There are also a series of nasal vowels.

Consonants

References 

 Campbell, Lyle (1997). American Indian languages: the historical linguistics of Native America. Oxford: Oxford University Press. .
 
 
 Greenberg, Joseph H. (1987). Language in the Americas. Stanford, California: Stanford University Press.
 Kaufman, Terrence (1990). "Language History in South America: What we know and how to know more." In Doris L. Payne, ed. Amazonian Linguistics, pp. 13–74. Austin: University of Texas Press.

 
Proposed language families

eo:Makro-ĉibĉa lingvaro